Eucereon pica is a moth of the subfamily Arctiinae. It was described by Francis Walker in 1855. It is found in Costa Rica, Peru and Rio de Janeiro, Brazil.

Subspecies
Eucereon pica pica (Brazil: Rio de Janeiro)
Eucereon pica tigrata (Herrich-Schäffer, [1855]) (Costa Rica, Peru)

References

 

pica
Moths described in 1855